The FC Basel 1922–23 season was their thirtieth season since the club's foundation on 15 November 1893. The club's chairman was Karl Ibach. It was his second period as chairman. At the AGM he took over the presidency from Carl Burkhardt. FC Basel played their home games in the Landhof in the district Wettstein in Kleinbasel.

Overview 
For the beginning of this season the club hired the ex German international Max Breunig as trainer. He came from Karlsruher FV where he had been trainer for two seasons. Basel played a total of 32 matches in this season. 14 of these were in the domestic league and 18 were friendly matches. Of these 18 friendlies, six were home games played in the Landhof and 12 were away games. Nine test games ended in a victory, four were drawn and five ended in a defeat. In these tests Basel scored a total of 45 goals and conceded 28. Of these 18 friendlies, seven were during the winter break and one was a mid season game eight were played after the domestic league season had been completed.

After just two pre-season friendlies Basel started in the 1921–22 Swiss Serie A. The domestic league was again divided into three regional groups, East, Central and West, each group with eight teams. FC Basel and the two other teams from Basel Nordstern and Old Boys were allocated to the Central group. The other teams playing in this group were Aarau, Luzern and Biel-Bienne and the two teams from the capital, Young Boys Bern and FC Bern. FC Basel played a mediocre season, winning six matches, drawing three and suffering five defeats, scoring 17 goals and conceding 22. With 15 points they ended the season in fourth position. Otto Kuhn was the team's top league goal scorer with four goals. 

An outrage and scandal after the 8th round match at the Landhof on 12 November 1922 against BSC Young Boys. It came to spme massive disagreements between Basel manager Breunig's co-trainer Mr Sutter, the players of both teams and some fans. The Swiss Football Association started an enquiry immediately and postponed the match Basel against Luzern from 3 December 1922 to 18 February the following year. After an appeal the results of the enquiry ended with following decision: The club Basel was fined 200 Swiss Francs, co-trainer Mr Sutter was banned for three years, Basel's player Gustav Putzendopler was banned for six months, Young Boy's players Osterwalder and von Arx were both fined 20 Swiss Francs, Referee Josef Wieland received a life long ban for the top tier of Swiss football. The club Basel had to pay the costs of the court and it was decided that the team had to play two games behind closed doors. Because Basel won the appeal they did not have to play two matches without supporters, but the fine remained unchanged.

Another outrage and scandal was that the team Young Boys sportingly ended the season as Central group winners. But before the start of the championship play-offs, the qualification match FC Biel-Bienne versus FC Bern (the game had ended 3–1) from 25.02.1923 was awarded 0–3 due to ineligible players of FC Biel-Bienne. So both Young Boys Bern and FC Bern were level with 22 points and consequently a play-off was to be held for the regional championship. Young Boys withdrew from this match. Thus FC Bern continued to the finals, which they won. After the play-offs finals had been completed, the qualification match Basel versus FC Bern (the game had ended 0–4) from 04.02.1923 was awarded 3–0 forfait because FC Bern had played an ineligible player. After this decision Young Boys were again winners of the regional group. The date of this decision was in September 1923 and there was not enough time left for a new Play-off Final before the next season started. Therefore no Swiss championship was awarded for 1922/23 season.

Players 
Squad members

Results 

Legend

Friendly matches

Pre-season

Winter break to end of season

Serie A

Central Group results

Central Group table

See also
 History of FC Basel
 List of FC Basel players
 List of FC Basel seasons

References

Sources 
 Rotblau: Jahrbuch Saison 2014/2015. Publisher: FC Basel Marketing AG. 
 Die ersten 125 Jahre. Publisher: Josef Zindel im Friedrich Reinhardt Verlag, Basel. 
 FCB team 1922–23 at fcb-archiv.ch
 Switzerland 1922-23 at RSSSF

External links
 FC Basel official site

FC Basel seasons
Basel